This is a list of NUTS3 statistical regions of Ireland by Human Development Index as of 2022 with data for the year 2021.

References 

Ireland
Ireland
Human Development Index